Yermashi is a rural locality (a village) in Gamovskoye Rural Settlement, Permsky District, Perm Krai, Russia. The population was 23 as of 2010. There is 1 street.

Geography 
Yermashi is located 19 km southwest of Perm (the district's administrative centre) by road. Osentsy is the nearest rural locality.

References 

Rural localities in Permsky District